Iulian Daniel Anca-Trip (born 28 February 1995) is a Romanian professional footballer who plays as a goalkeeper for CSM Satu Mare. Born in Oradea, Anca-Trip grew up at Liberty Salonta academy and also played at senior level for Olimpia Satu Mare, UTA Arad and Sportul Snagov before his transfer to Metaloglobus București in the summer of 2018.

References

External links
 
 

1995 births
Living people
Sportspeople from Oradea
Romanian footballers
Association football goalkeepers
Romania youth international footballers
CF Liberty Oradea players
Liga II players
FC Olimpia Satu Mare players
FC UTA Arad players
CS Sportul Snagov players
FC Metaloglobus București players
CS Luceafărul Oradea players
ACS Viitorul Târgu Jiu players
CS Aerostar Bacău players
FC Unirea Constanța players
Liga I players
FC Botoșani players
Liga III players